Highway 30 is a highway in the Canadian province of Saskatchewan. It runs from the Eston Riverside Regional Park on the South Saskatchewan River until Highway 7.

Major intersections 
From south to north:

References

030